Harold Ryan may refer to:

Harold Lyman Ryan (1923–1995), U.S. federal judge from Idaho
Harold M. Ryan (1911–2007), American politician and judge from Michigan
Harold Ryan, former president of Bungie and CEO of ProbablyMonstets
Harold Ryan, character in the Kurt Vonnegut play, Happy Birthday, Wanda June

See also
Harry Ryan (disambiguation)